Metrocentre is a shopping centre and entertainment complex in the Dunston area of Gateshead. It is located on the former site of Dunston Power Station, near to the River Tyne.

Metrocentre opened in stages, with the first phase opening on 28 April 1986, and the official opening being held on 14 October that year. Additional retail space can be found in the adjoining Metro Retail Park and MetrOasis.

History

Metrocentre's construction was financed by the Church Commissioners of England, and was masterminded by Sir John Hall's company, Cameron Hall Developments. The ground upon which it is built was purchased for £100,000 in the early 1970s. Access to the development was facilitated by an urban development grant from the Department of the Environment, and the Metropolitan Borough of Gateshead.

The first phase of the development, the Red Mall, was opened in April 1986. At the time, it featured a large Carrefour supermarket, which later became a Gateway, and subsequently Asda. Metrocentre also featured the first out-of-town branch of Marks & Spencer.

In August 1987 the MetroCentre railway station, which is connected to the centre via a covered footbridge, was opened by British Rail.

1990s–2000s 
In October 1995, the centre was sold to Capital Shopping Centres (later intu Properties) for £364 million, although the Church Commissioners retained a 10% stake.

In 1997, Asda moved from Metrocentre to a larger stand-alone store nearby, facilitating the redevelopment of the Red Mall, anchored by a Debenhams department store, opened in October 2004. The refurbishment programme at the time also included the construction of a new Transport Interchange, sited at the edge of the Blue Mall, replacing the former bus station.

In November 2006, centre owner Capital Shopping Centres announced plans to redevelop the centre's Yellow Mall. The Metroland indoor funfair closed in April 2008, and the area, along with the neighbouring Clockworks Food Court, has since been refurbished to become Metrocentre Qube.

Until August 2007, when it was purchased for £82.5 million, the adjacent retail park was not under the same ownership as the shopping centre.

2010s–2020s 
In December 2009 the Odeon relocated from the Blue Mall to the Qube, and in Autumn 2010, the first TK Maxx Homesense store opened on the site of the former cinema in the Blue Mall. In 2012 the Central Mall was redeveloped as the Platinum Mall, which focuses on higher-end stores and designer outlets. Initial stores in the Platinum Mall included Mamas & Papas, H&M Kids and Tessuti.

The centre was rebranded as intu Metrocentre in 2013, following the renaming of its parent Capital Shopping Centres Group as intu Properties.

In March 2018, a 78,000 sq ft Next store opened, taking twelve shops on the upper floor, and the former BHS unit on the lower level, to create one of the largest Next stores in the country. Next further expanded their presence in the centre in 2020 by opening a Beauty & Home store in the former Debenhams anchor unit.

On 26 October 2020, it was announced that Sovereign Centros was to oversee asset management of the centre on behalf of owners Metrocentre Partnership, following the collapse of intu. The shopping centre was again rebranded, as The Metrocentre, with Savills as on-site property managers. Owners, the Metrocentre Partnership includes Church Commissioners and GIC Real Estate.

Malls and retailers

The Metrocentre has five malls: Red, Green, Blue, Yellow and Platinum.

Many large retail chains are represented in the centre. It is anchored by a number of large stores and department stores:
Marks & Spencer (Green Mall)
Next (Green Mall) 
Next Beauty & Home (Red Mall) (Formerly Debenhams)
Harrods Beauty (Town Square) (Formerly House of Fraser)
Primark (Exhibition Square)
TK Maxx (Blue Mall)

Major fashion retailers include: All Saints, H&M, New Look, Next, Primark, River Island and Zara.

Other major retailers include: Boots, Hotel Chocolat, Poundland, WH Smith, Ann Summers, Lush, Waterstones, Lego, and Apple.

Leisure facilities

The centre's leisure facilities, located in the Qube, consist of an Odeon cinema and Namco Funscape, an indoor amusement arcade. Both are located in the Qube, Yellow Mall, on the site of the former Metroland theme park.

The Odeon, a 12 screen cinema, opened in 2010. It features a VIP lounge, as well as multiple 3D screens, and an IMAX Digital – the first in the north-east of England.

The Namco Funscape is located on the lower floor, and is a family entertainment centre including an 18-lane ten-pin bowling alley, dodgem ride and soft play. The Qube's exterior is clad with zinc and glass, to distinguish it as the entertainment part of the centre.

Qube is also home to a number of restaurants, including Bella Italia, Nando's, Pizza Express, YO! Sushi and Zizzi.

Reflecting its Church of England origins, Metrocentre is one of the few European shopping centres to have a full-time resident chaplain. Services are held on special occasions such as Mothering Sunday, Remembrance Sunday, and at Christmas.

Metroland
Until its closure in April 2008, Metrocentre featured an entirely enclosed theme park called Metroland. Renamed The New Metroland following a refurbishment by operators Arlington Leisure in 1996, it was Europe's largest indoor amusement park. Metroland opened in February 1988 at the cost of £20 million. The park featured a roller coaster, Ferris wheel, pirate ship, waltzers, a miniature railway and dodgem cars among its rides.

Its closure made way for redevelopment of the Yellow Mall, including a new Odeon cinema, as well as the Namco Funscape arcade, and a number of restaurants.

On the final weekend of operation (19–20 April 2008), the park held the 'Last Ride Weekend', where the admission price was £5 for the whole day, with unlimited access to all the rides. The park finally closed at 8:00 pm on 20 April 2008, despite strong local opposition, and petitions raising around 4,000 signatures against the closure. Proceeds from the last night of operation went to charity.

The Metroland roller coaster was later relocated to The Big Sheep, a farm-themed amusement park in Abbotsham, northern Devon. The ride entered operation in March 2016. The park offered a free ride to visitors from the north-east of England for a period after the ride's opening.

Metro Retail Park
Metro Retail Park is situated to the west of Metrocentre. It has the layout of a conventional out-of-town retail park, with large stores such as Barker and Stonehouse, Oak Furniture Land and Furniture Village.

McDonald's and Pizza Hut are both situated to the south of the retail park site (in addition to other sites within Metrocentre). Further west of the retail park, there is a 24-hour Asda supermarket, Aldi supermarket, Greggs bakery, an IKEA, The Range and Sports Direct (the former site of Danish furniture store, ILVA). To the south is a Marriott Hotel.

metrOasis
The metrOasis retail area, on the perimeter of the shopping centre, opened to the public in September 2012. It is located between Qube and the Metro Retail Park, on the site of a former petrol station. The development is home to a range of dining and entertainment venues, with construction beginning in January 2012. The retail area includes drive-thru Krispy Kreme Doughnuts and Starbucks, as well as a Toby Carvery.

Transport 
The Metrocentre has a large bus station and the MetroCentre railway station is connected to the centre via a covered footbridge. The centre's car parking facilities has approximately 10,000 spaces.

References

External links

Shopping centres in Tyne and Wear
Buildings and structures in Gateshead
Metroland
Metroland
Shopping malls established in 1986
1986 establishments in England
Amusement parks opened in 1986